The 2018 Euro Beach Soccer League (EBSL) was the 21st edition of the Euro Beach Soccer League, the annual, premier competition in European beach soccer contested between men's national teams. It was organised by Beach Soccer Worldwide (BSWW), in a league and play-off format.

This season, teams continued to take part in two divisions, the top tier (Division A) and the bottom tier (Division B). 12 teams continued to contest Division A, consisting of the top 11 finishers from last year plus Turkey who were promoted to the top tier. Whilst Division B accommodated 15 nations: 13 nations who did not gain promotion from last season, Georgia who made their debut, plus Greece who were relegated from the top tier at the end of last season. No nations returned after an absence from competing in recent years, however, the Netherlands, who had competed in the last two seasons, did not enter this year.

A total of five stages of fixtures were scheduled during the regular season. Each team from Division A played in two stages whilst each team in Division B played in one. At each stage the participating nations earned points for the overall league tables.

At the end of the regular season, according to the league tables, the eight best teams in Division A advanced to the post-season event, the Superfinal, to compete to become the winners of this year's EBSL. Meanwhile, the top seven teams in Division B (the four group winners and three best runners-up) and the team ranked bottom of Division A played in a different post-season event, the Promotion Final, to try to earn a spot in Division A next year.

The top scorer of the 2002 season, Alan of Portugal, announced his retirement on 11 June; Alan competed in all 20 EBSL seasons since the inaugural edition in 1998, meaning this year marked the first EBSL season in which he did not feature.

The league also acted as the qualification route to the 2019 European Games; the top six teams of the Superfinal plus the Promotion Final winners qualified to joint hosts Belarus.

Germany, the defending Division A team in the Promotion Final, beat Romania in the final to win the event, therefore retaining their Division A status for next season. Russia were the defending champions but were knocked out of title-winning contention in the group stage of the Superfinal, ultimately finishing fourth in the post-season event, just the second time (the other 2005), that Russia failed to finish in the top three. The concluding match of the Superfinal was contested between Italy and Spain, who were looking to end 13 and 12-year waits since their last respective EBSL titles (2005 and 2006). Italy, on home sand, won the match on penalties to claim their second European title.

Calendar and locations 
The schedule was announced on 23 March.

For the first time, Azerbaijan and Belarus hosted an EBSL regular season stage. It was also the first time since the 2013 season that no nations in Division B hosted a stage, only the second time this had occurred since divisions were introduced in 2002.

Teams

The following teams have entered this season, in the following divisions (12 in Division A, 15 in Division B).

The numbers in parentheses show the European ranking of each team prior to the start of the season, out of 36 nations.

Division A

  (1st)
  (2nd)
  (3rd)
  (4th)
  (5th)
  (6th)

  (7th)
  (8th)
  (10th)
  (12th)
  (14th)
 1 (15th)

Division B

  (9th)
  (11th)
  (13th)
 2 (16th)
  (17th)
  (18th)
  (19th)
  (21st)

  (22nd)
  (23rd)
  (24th)
  (25th)
  (26th)
  (28th)
 3 (29th)

Notes:
1. Promoted from Division B at the end of the 2017 season
2. Relegated from Division A at the end of the 2017 season
3. Teams making their debut

Stage 1 (Baku, 22–24 June)
Matches are listed as local time in Baku, AZT (UTC+4).

All matches took place at the Baku Beach Arena, part of the Flag Square cluster of the European Games Park in Sabail raion, with a capacity of 3,900. The stadium previously hosted the beach soccer event at the 2015 European Games.

There were no Division B fixtures during this stage.

Division A

Group 1

Group 2

Awards
The following were presented after the conclusion of the final day's matches.

Stage 2 (Nazaré, 6–8 July)

Matches are listed as local time in Nazaré, WEST (UTC+1)

All matches took place at the Estádio do Viveiro on Praia de Nazaré (Nazaré Beach), in tandem with the hosting of the 2018 Women's Euro Beach Soccer Cup.

The stadium had recently been undergoing redevelopment, increasing its capacity from 1,600 to 2,200. However, one part of the stadium was still awaiting upgrades, meaning the new capacity figure was yet to be fully reached.

During this round, Bulgaria won a stage title for the first time (in either division).

Division A

Division B

Group 1

Group 2

The Serbia vs. Estonia match was the first goalless draw in the 20-year history of the EBSL.

Awards
The following were presented after the conclusion of the final day's matches. Individual awards apply to Division A only.

Stage 3 (Moscow, 20–22 July)
Matches are listed as local time in Moscow, MSK (UTC+3).

All matches took place at Yantar Beach Soccer Stadium in the district of Strogino, with a capacity of 2,500.

This was the eighth time Moscow hosted an EBSL event, drawing level with Marseille as the cities to host the most events in the league's history.

During this round, Kazakhstan won an EBSL stage title for the first time (in either division).

Division A

Switzerland, Azerbaijan and Poland are ranked accordingly based on their three-way head-to-head results

Division B

Awards
The following were presented after the conclusion of the final day's matches. Individual awards apply to Division A only.

Stage 4 (Minsk, 3–5 August)
Matches are listed as local time in Minsk, FET (UTC+3).

All matches took place at the National Beach Soccer Stadium, part of the Olympic Sports Complex in Pyershamayski District, with a capacity of 1,300.

With construction beginning on 8 June, the stadium was a newbuild, commissioned specifically for the purpose of hosting the beach soccer event at the 2019 European Games; this stage was organised to take place in Minsk to serve as test event for the new venue ahead of the upcoming games.

There were no Division B fixtures during this stage; this contributes to the fact this was the first stage to feature just four teams since the Moscow stage of the 2013 season.

Division A

Awards
The following were presented after the conclusion of the final day's matches.

Stage 5 (Warnemünde, 24–26 August)

Matches are listed as local time in Warnemünde, CEST (UTC+2)

All matches took place on the site of the Sport & Beach Arena on Warnemünde Beach, at the purpose built DFB Beachsoccer Arena, with a capacity of approximately 1,500 seats.

Georgia made their EBSL debut during this stage, the 34th different nation to compete in the league.

England claimed the Division B stage crown, meaning they won back-to-back second-tier titles for the first time.

Division A

Division B

Awards
The following were presented after the conclusion of the final day's matches. Individual awards apply to Division A only.

League tables
At end of regular season

Ranking & tie-breaking criteria: Division A – 1. Points earned 2. Goal difference 3. Goals scored | Division B – 1. Highest group placement 2. Points earned 3. Goal difference 4. Goals scored 5. Results against 4th place team

Division A

Division B
Note: Since one group in Division B consisted of just three teams, for the teams who finished in 1st, 2nd or 3rd in a group of four, their results against the 4th placed team in their groups have been discounted.

Key:
Team group placement:  1st place /  2nd place /  3rd place /  4th place(Q) – Qualified to Promotion Final as a group winner(q) – Qualified to Promotion Final as a best group runner-up

Promotion Final (Alghero, 6–9 September)

Matches are listed as local time in Alghero, CEST (UTC+2)

All matches took place at a purpose built stadium on Spiaggia del Lido di San Giovanni, with a capacity of approximately 1,500.

The winners of the Promotion Final earned a place in Division A next season; they also qualified for the 2019 European Games.

(Note two teams were ineligible to qualify to the European Games: Germany, as the team that finished 12th in Division A and Kazakhstan, who are not a member of the European Olympic Committees. In the event one of these teams was to win the Promotion Final, the next highest ranked eligible team would qualify in their place.)

Qualified teams
The teams in bold qualified as Division B regular season group winners; those in italics qualified as the three best group runners-up.

The team in  attempted to retain their position in Division A, having finished bottom of the regular season table.

 
 
1
 

 
 
 
2 (Last place, Division A)

Notes:
1. First appearance in Promotion Final
2. First appearance as defending Division A team in Promotion Final

Group stage

Group 1

Group 2

Play-off stage

Seventh place play-off

Fifth place play-off

Third place play-off

Promotion play-off final

Final standings
Germany won the event to retain their Division A status for the 2019 EBSL season; this was just the second time in ten attempts since the Promotion Final was introduced that the defending Division A team successfully won it to preserve their top tier membership (the other France in 2011). Consequently, no Division B team earned promotion to the top division and no Division A team was relegated this year.

Romania claimed the single qualification berth to the 2019 European Games available in the Promotion Final as the highest ranked team eligible to qualify in the final standings.

Superfinal (Alghero, 6–9 September)

Matches are listed as local time in Alghero, CEST (UTC+2)

All matches took place at a purpose built stadium on Spiaggia del Lido di San Giovanni, with a capacity of approximately 1,500.

The winners of the Superfinal were crowned 2018 EBSL champions; the top six (excl. Belarus as they qualified automatically as Games hosts) also earned qualification to the 2019 European Games.

Qualified teams
The top eight teams from Division A, as per the end of regular season league table, qualified for the Superfinal.

 
 
 
 

 
 (hosts)
1

Notes:
1. First appearance in Superfinal

Group stage

Group 1

Group 2

Play-off stage

Seventh place play-off

Fifth place play-off

Third place play-off

Superfinal match

Post-match reactions

Awards

Winners trophy

Individual awards
Awarded for feats achieved in the Superfinal only

Final standings
Finalists Spain and Italy faced each other for the first time in an EBSL title-decider; both teams were appearing in their second finals (the others 2014 and 2010 respectively) since they each last won their most recent titles (2006 and 2005 respectively). It was also just the second time (the other Spain vs. France, 2003) that neither Russia nor Portugal reached the final.

By winning the Superfinal, Italy ended a 13-year drought (the then current longest wait of any team with a previous title win) to claim their second EBSL crown; both titles were won on penalties. After nine successive wins, including claiming first place in the regular season, this was Spain's first loss of the season; their wait for a sixth title now continues into its 13th year.

Belarus' 5th-place finish was their joint best result (with 2016); the sixth European Games qualifier was therefore decided in the seventh place play-off between Ukraine and Azerbaijan, won by the former.

Season statistics

Top scorers
The following tables list the top 12 scorers in each division, including goals scored in both the regular and post season events. Note there is no award presented for these season-encompassing scoring feats, the tables are for statistical purposes only. Scoring awards were bestowed per stage, with the primary award that which was presented in the Superfinal.

Division A

†. Includes 3 goals scored in the Promotion Final vs. Division B teams.

Division B

Source

Most assists
The following tables list the top 10 assistants in each division including assists provided in both the regular and post season events.

Division A

Division B

Source

Discipline
The following table lists the players and teams who received the most penalties for disciplinary infringements in each division in both the regular and post season events.

Source

References

External links 
 Beach Soccer Worldwide (BSWW), official website
 Announcement & format

 Stage 1, Baku 
 Stage 2, Nazaré 
 Stage 3, Moscow 
 Stage 4, Minsk 
 Stage 5, Warnemünde 
 Superfinal, Alghero 

Euro Beach Soccer League 2018 , at Beach Soccer Russia (in Russian)

Euro Beach Soccer League
2018 in beach soccer
2018 in Azerbaijani sport
2018 in Portuguese sport
2018 in Russian sport
2018 in Belarusian sport
2018 in German sport
2018 in Italian sport
Euro Beach Soccer